John Stuart Moule (born 29 May 1971) is the Warden of Radley College, and a former Head Master of Bedford School.

Biography

Born in Shrewsbury on 29 May 1971, John Moule was educated at Lady Margaret Hall, Oxford, where he was a Scholar and gained a first class degree in History. He taught at Dean Close School, between 1993 and 1998, was Head of History at Stowe School, between 1998 and 2000, and then a housemaster at Stowe. He was Vice Master of Bedford School, between 2006 and 2008. He was Headmaster of Bedford School, between 2008 and 2014, and became Warden of Radley College in 2014.

John Moule writes for The Huffington Post.

References

1971 births
Living people
Alumni of Lady Margaret Hall, Oxford
Headmasters of Bedford School
Schoolteachers from Shropshire
Wardens of Radley College